Bob Deacon (died October 1 2017) was a prominent social policy academic and policy advisor credited by Kaasch and Stubbs with responsibility for the introduction of the term global social policy.

Career
He was Emeritus Professor of International Social Policy at the University of Sheffield.  He was the founding editor of the journal Global Social Policy: An international journal of social development and public policy and an elected fellow of the Academy of Social Sciences.

He has been an advisor or consultant on international social policy to the ILO, WHO, UNESCO, UNDP, UNDESA, EC, Council of Europe, and World Bank. From 2007 he was an Associate Research Fellow at the United Nations University (UNU-CRIS) in Bruges.

Selected publications 
 Deacon, Bob. (1997) Global social policy: International organizations and the future of welfare. Sage. 
 Deacon, B. (2007). Global social policy and governance. Sage.

References

20th-century births
2017 deaths
British social scientists
Year of birth missing
Place of birth missing
Academics of the University of Sheffield
Fellows of the Academy of Social Sciences